Gomyek or Gomik or Gom Yek may refer to:
 Gomyek-e Sofla
 Gomyek-e Vosta